City of Angels: Music from the Motion Picture is the soundtrack album for the film City of Angels, released by Warner Bros. Records on March 31, 1998 (see 1998 in music).

Reception

Yahoo! Music's Craig Rosen, who called the album "a stroke of marketing genius", speculated that executive producer Rob Cavallo, who was head of Morissette and the Goo Goo Dolls' management firm, "was instrumental in making sure the soundtrack provided a nice set-up for the forthcoming Morissette and Goo Goo Dolls albums [Supposed Former Infatuation Junkie and Dizzy Up the Girl, respectively] ... Record executives and managers love big hits from soundtracks, especially when they dovetail into a new release by one of their artists. That's the case with both Morissette and the Goo Goo Dolls and it's not a mere coincidence." Bob Bell, a new release buyer for the Wherehouse Entertainment chain of stores in Torrance, California, said the marketing of the album was "amazing" and attributed its early strong sales to "Uninvited". He said of the Goo Goo Dolls that the soundtrack "helped to re-establish them ... [it] brought them back into our minds". Robert Scally wrote of "Uninvited", "Placing exclusives on soundtracks ... has been a successful tactic for creating a buzz around the album while highlighting the musical artist".

Commercial performance
The City of Angels soundtrack debuted at number 23 on the Billboard 200 chart on the issue dated 18 April 1998. The following week it entered the top ten at number seven and eventually reached the runner-up position for three weeks until it topped the charts in early June, selling 165,000 copies. City of Angels finished the year as the seventh highest-selling album of 1998. To date the soundtrack has sold 5.5 million units in the United States and has been certified five times Platinum by the Recording Industry Association of America. Additionally, it peaked at number three on the Canadian charts and has sold over 700,000 copies in the country.

Elsewhere, the soundtrack also performed well, reaching number one in Australia, Germany, New Zealand and Switzerland. It has been certified Platinum in Japan and multi-Platinum in Australia.

Singles
Its two singles, the Goo Goo Dolls' "Iris" and Alanis Morissette's "Uninvited", were released to U.S. radio in March and were still receiving substantial radio airplay by the following August. An internet and radio leak of "Uninvited" in early March forced Warner Bros. to release the entire soundtrack to radio before it became available in stores. According to a publicity manager for Warner Music Canada, the measure was "an inconvenience" taken to stop radio stations from playing low-quality versions of the song downloaded from the internet.
"Iris" reached number one on Billboard's Modern Rock Tracks, Top 40 Mainstream and Adult Top 40 charts in the U.S., and it spent a record amount of time atop the Hot 100 Airplay chart. "Uninvited" reached number one on the Top 40 Mainstream and peaked inside the top five on the Adult Top 40.

Track listing

Charts

Weekly charts

Year-end charts

End of decade charts

Sales and certifications

Personnel 

Howie B – Producer, Engineer, Mixing
James Barton – Mixing
John Bell – Orchestration
Dario Rossetti Bonell – Guitar (Acoustic)
Carlos Bonnell – Guitar (Acoustic)
Danny Bramson – Producer, Music Supervisor
Francis Buckley – Engineer
Greg Burns – Second Engineer
David Campbell – String Arrangements
Rob Cavallo – Guitar (Acoustic), Producer
Chas Chandler – Producer
Chris Chaney – Bass
Dickie Chappell – Programming, Engineer
Jude Christodal – Guitar (Acoustic), Vocals
Jason Cienkus – Soundtrack Coordination
Eric Clapton – Performer
Paula Cole – Producer, Performer
Alan Coleman – Assistant Engineer
Katherine Delaney – Design
Tom Dowd – Producer
Flood – Producer
Meabh Flynn – Assistant Engineer
Peter Gabriel – Bass, Keyboards, Programming, Producer, Sampling, Performer
Ben Georgiades – Engineer
The Goo Goo Dolls – Producer, Performer
Keith Grant – Engineer
Steve Griffen – Engineer, Associate Producer

Isobel Griffiths – Orchestra Contractor
Steve Hall – Mastering
Chris Haynes – Second Engineer
Jimi Hendrix – Performer
Ben Hillier – Mixing Assistant
John Lee Hooker – Performer
Paul Hulme – Engineer
Alan Jenkins – Programming
Jude – Performer
Manu Katche – Drums
Paul Kimble – Chamberlin
Rob Kirwan – Assistant Engineer
Carys Lane – Vocals
Nick Lashley – Guitar (Acoustic)
Dave Lawson – Programming
Tony Levin – Bass
Jolie Levine-Aller – Project Coordinator
Brian MacLeod – Drums
Pat Magnarella – Executive Producer
Clif Magness – Guitar (Electric), Producer
Dominique Mahut – Percussion
Mike Malinin – Percussion, Drums
Pierre Marchand – Producer, Engineer, Mixing
Conal Markey – Assistant Engineer, Mixing Assistant
Sarah McLachlan – Performer
Metro Voices – Choir, Chorus
Alanis Morissette – Vocals, Producer, Performer

Roger Moutenot – Engineer, Mixing
Jamie Muhoberac – Piano, Keyboards
Gary Novak – Percussion, Drums
Jennie O'Grady – Director
Steve Osborne – Producer, Mixing
Matt Palmer – Assistant Engineer
Tim Pierce – Mandolin, Electric Guitar
Damir Prcic – Chamberlin
Jack Joseph Puig – Mixing
Harry Rabinowitz – Conductor
David Rhodes – Guitar
Carmen Rizzo – Programming
Georges Rodi – Programming
Charles Roven – Executive Producer
Johnny Rzeznik – Guitar, Vocals
Rafa Sardina – Second Engineer
Bill Sewell – Bass (Upright)
Allen Sides – Engineer, Mixing
Kenneth Sillito – Violin, Leader
Mark "Spike" Stent – Engineer, Mixing
Alex Swift – Programming
Robby Takac – Bass
U2 – Performer
Scott Welch – Executive Producer
Kirsty Whalley – Programming
Will White – Percussion
Rolf Wilson – Violin, Leader
Nick Wollage – Assistant Engineer
Gabriel Yared – Producer, Orchestration

See also
Best-selling albums in the United States since Nielsen SoundScan tracking began
Number-one albums of 1998 (U.S.)

References

1998 soundtrack albums
Warner Records soundtracks
Rock soundtracks
Fantasy film soundtracks